Ronaldo Marques Sereno, also known as Ronaldo (born March 14, 1962, is a former Brazilian footballer who played as a forward.
He was member of squad of 1981 FIFA World Youth Championship

He played for Ulsan Hyundai of the South Korean K League, then known as Hyundai Horangi.

Honours

References

Profile at Flamengo

External links
 
 

1962 births
Living people
Brazilian footballers
Brazilian expatriate footballers
Brazil under-20 international footballers
Brazil international footballers
Association football midfielders
Expatriate footballers in South Korea
CR Flamengo footballers
Ulsan Hyundai FC players
K League 1 players
Brazilian expatriate sportspeople in South Korea